The Coupe des nations Ville Saguenay was a bicycle stage race held annually in Saguenay, Quebec, Canada. It was part of the UCI America Tour and the race was reserved to riders between 19 and 22 of age and was rated 2.Ncup by the UCI. It was the only U23 race held outside of Europe.

In 2014, the race was no longer part of the Nations' Cup calendar, and instead, was held as the Grand Prix Cycliste de Saguenay.

Results

References

External links

UCI America Tour races
Cycle races in Canada
Sport in Saguenay, Quebec
Recurring sporting events established in 2008
2008 establishments in Quebec
2013 disestablishments in Quebec
Defunct cycling races in Canada